Arnold Monto  (born March 22, 1933) is an American physician and epidemiologist. At the University of Michigan School of Public Health, Monto is the Thomas Francis Jr. Collegiate Professor of Public Health, professor of epidemiology, and professor of global public health. His research focuses on the occurrence, prevention, and treatment of infectious diseases in industrialized and developing countries' populations.

Education

Born in Brooklyn, New York, Monto graduated from Erasmus Hall High School. He received a B.A. in zoology from Cornell University in 1954 and earned his M.D. from Cornell University Medical College, now Weill Cornell Medicine, in 1958. From 1958 to 1960, he completed his internship and residency in medicine at the Vanderbilt University Medical Center. From 1960 to 1962, he was a USPHS Post-Doctoral Fellow in Infectious Diseases at Stanford University Medical Center.

Career
Monto fulfilled his national service commitment in the Virus Diseases Section of the Middle America Research Unit: a part of the National Institute of Allergy and Infectious Diseases. While there, he began his career-long interest in respiratory illnesses; confirming that the same viruses causing illnesses in the temperate zones cause illnesses in the tropics. He was among the first to observe that influenza viruses, in areas where temperatures were stable year-round, mainly occurred in the rainy season. In 1965, Monto was recruited to the University of Michigan School of Public Health by Thomas Francis Jr., chair of and professor in the school's Department of Epidemiology. Monto rose through the academic ranks from research associate to professor. He served as chair of the school's Department of Population Planning and International Health from 1993 to 1996, and as director of the University of Michigan Center for Population Planning. From 2002 to 2004, Monto was director of the University of Michigan Bioterrorism Preparedness Initiative. In 2010, he was named the Thomas Francis Collegiate Professor of Public Health. He is the founder and director of the University of Michigan-Israel Public Health Partnership for collaborative research and education (2014–present) and is co-director of the Michigan Center for Respiratory Virus Research and Response, one of five centers across the country that collects data for the Centers for Disease Control and Prevention. Monto spent periods as a visiting scientist at Northwick Park Hospital Clinical Research Center, Harrow, England; at the World Health Organization, Geneva, working on implications of lower respiratory infections globally; and, at the National Research Council, Washington, D.C. organizing studies of the causes of respiratory infections in low-resourced countries.

He is author of over 350 research papers focusing mainly on the epidemiology and implications of respiratory infections and co-editor of Textbook of Influenza Second Edition.

In a career spanning six decades Monto has been involved in pandemic planning and emergency response to influenza and other respiratory virus outbreaks, including the 1968 Hong Kong influenza pandemic, avian influenza, SARS, MERS, and the COVID-19 pandemic.

In 2015, the U.S. Centers for Disease Control and Prevention established the annual "Arnold S. Monto Award" in honor of Monto for innovation in epidemiology and vaccinology. "Dr. Monto's work has helped us understand the value of measuring vaccine effectiveness in the communities where vaccines are used and taking that data to help enhance influenza prevention programs", said Joe Bresee, Chief of the Epidemiology and Prevention Branch of CDC's Influenza Division."

In 2020, Monto was selected to chair the U.S. Food and Drug Administration Vaccines and Related Biological Products Advisory Committee (VRBPAC) on COVID-19.  The committee of experts will discuss the development, authorization and/or licensure of COVID-19 vaccines and advise the agency on safety and effectiveness.

Research
Throughout his career, Monto has focused on the occurrence, prevention, and control of respiratory infections, with a particular interest in influenza. At the University of Michigan in 1965, he developed the Tecumseh Study of Respiratory Illness, which described the specific viruses involved in causing illnesses in American families over an 11-year period.  During the 1968 influenza pandemic, he found that vaccinating school-age children reduced infection in the entire community, an early demonstration of herd immunity. Subsequently, he was involved in evaluating a variety of strategies to control influenza including vaccines, antivirals, and non-pharmaceutical interventions such as antiseptic tissues and face masks. In particular, he designed and carried out critical studies evaluating the value of the neuraminidase inhibitors now in use for influenza. In the 2000s he was involved in developing pandemic control strategies including social distancing, leading to work at WHO and in the US during the 2009 swine flu pandemic. He also led clinical trials establishing the superiority of inactivated vaccines compared to live attenuated vaccines in preventing influenza in adults.

In 2010, Monto returned to the study of respiratory illnesses in families with the establishment of the Household Influenza Vaccine Evaluation (HIVE) Study. The design is a comprehensive one, allowing researchers to study many aspects of infection occurrence and prevention over time. The study has resulted in several notable findings related to natural infection with different viruses and the immune correlates of protection from different influenza vaccines. It was the first to demonstrate the potential problems with the serial use of such vaccines. These issues are now being addressed as part of the Universal Influenza Vaccine Program. Monto was the plenary speaker for a 2017 NIH-led workshop of U.S. and international experts from academia, industry, and government to develop a strategic plan and research agenda aimed at the development of a universal influenza vaccine. The design also allows study over time of other respiratory viruses including the coronaviruses.  Monto is involved in other studies assessing influenza vaccine effectiveness in preventing medical encounters and hospitalization with a goal of improving protection. A study in progress addresses the role of antivirals in seasonal and pandemic influenza control.

Selected service, international and national
 Pandemic Influenza Task Force, Infectious Disease Society of America, 2007–present
Board Member, European Scientific Working Group on Influenza, 2009–2016
WHO Influenza Pandemic Emergency Committee, 2009–2010
 President's Council of Advisors on Science and Technology H1N1 Working Group, 2009
Co-chair Neuraminidase Inhibitor Susceptibility Network, 2006–2013 
Co-chair, Infectious Disease Society of America Meetings on Seasonal and Pandemic Influenza, 2006–2010
Acute Respiratory Infections Subcommittee, US/Japan Cooperative Medical Science Panel, 2010 
Briefing on Pandemic Influenza, US State Department, Washington, DC, Health Committees of House of Commons and Senate, Ottawa, Canada, 2006–2007
 Advisor, Defense Threat Reduction Agency, U.S. Department of Defense, 2005–2009
 Pulmonary Diseases Advisory Committee, NHLBI, 1979–1983

Awards
2012 Charles Merieux Award, National Foundation for Infectious Diseases
2009 Alexander Fleming Award for Lifetime Achievement, Infectious Diseases Society of America

Selected publications

References

External links
The Germ Hunter: Arnold Monto

Erasmus Hall High School alumni
Cornell University College of Agriculture and Life Sciences alumni
American epidemiologists
University of Michigan School of Public Health alumni
University of Michigan faculty
Weill Cornell Medical College alumni
20th-century American scientists
21st-century American scientists
Scientists from Brooklyn
Physicians from New York City
Living people
Year of birth missing (living people)